Foggia is a city and former comune of Apulia, in Southern Italy, capital of the province of Foggia. In 2013, its population was 153,143. Foggia is the main city of a plain called Tavoliere, also known as the "granary of Italy".

History

The name "Foggia" (originally Focis) probably derives from Latin "fovea", meaning "pit", referring to the pits where wheat was stored. The name's etymology remains uncertain however, as it could as well stem from "Phocaea", or possibly probably from the Medieval Greek word for "fire", which is "fotia", as according to legend the original settlers of the 11th century AD were peasants, allegedly after having [miraculously] discovered there a panel portraying the Madonna Nicopeia, on which three flames burnt.

The area had been settled since Neolithic times, and later on a Daunian settlement known as Arpi (in Greek Argos Hippium or Ἀργόριππα) existed nearby, close to present-day . It was the largest city in ancient Daunia. An anachronistic legend reported by Pliny claimed that the Daunian city had been founded by Diomedes following the Trojan War.

However the first document attesting to the existence of the modern city dates to 1100, in the papal bull of Pope Paschal II which mentions the church of Sancta Maria de Focis. The area remained marshy and unhealthy until the late 11th century, when Robert Guiscard directed draining the wetland, boosting the economic and social growth of the city. The city was the seat of Henry, Count of Monte Sant'Angelo during the last twenty years of the 11th century. In the 12th century, William II of Sicily built a cathedral here and further enlarged the settlement.

Frederick II had a palace built in Foggia in 1223, in which he often sojourned. He elected the city "Regalis Sedes Inclita Imperialis", the preferred seat of the Empire, as we can now read on the entrance epigraph of the remains of the imperial palace. It was also seat of his court and a studium, including notable figures such as the mathematician and scholar Michael Scot, but little of it remains now.  In 1447, King Alfonso V of Aragon built a Custom Palace to tax the local sheep farmers. This caused a decline of the local economy and the progressive ruin of the land, which again became marshy. In 1456, an earthquake struck Foggia, followed by others in 1534, 1627 and 1731, the last destroying one third of the city. The House of Bourbon promoted a certain economic growth by boosting the cereal agriculture of Capitanata and rebuilding much of the settlement.

In the 19th century, Foggia received a railway station and important public monuments. The citizens also took part in the riots which led to the annexation to Italy in 1861. By 1865, there was a definitive shift from the custom of sheep farming in favour of an agricultural economy.

The historical lack of water resources was solved with the construction of the Apulian aqueduct in 1924, when Foggia was already an important hub between northern and southern Italy.

During World War II, Foggia was heavily bombed by the Allied air forces for its important airfields and marshalling yards. After the armistice of Cassibile on 8 September 1943, the town was briefly occupied by German troops in Operation Achse. There was some fighting there during the Allied invasion of Italy. In response to the Allied advance towards them, the German troops occupying Foggia abandoned the city on the 27th of September. By the 1st of October British troops had successfully occupied the city.  In order to clear the Germans from the hills north and west of the Fogia plain and to reach the Vinchiaturo-Termoli road near the Biferno River, Britain's General Montgomery sent his British XIII Corps beyond Foggia on a two division drive, the 78th Division (sometimes known as "the Battle Axe division") moved on the coastal road to Termoli and the 1st Canadian Division struck inland through the mountains.  British V Corps followed, protecting the west flank and the rear.  The German 1st parachute division had largely withdrawn to the Biferno River near Termoli and dug in.  Based out of Foggia, the British launched Operation Devon and succeeded in dislodging the Nazi German forces from Termoli. The Foggia airfields were subsequently used by Allied fighter and bomber formations until the end of the war, mainly from the American 15th but also from the 12th Air Force, the Royal Air Force and the South African Air Force.

In 1959 and 2006, Foggia received, respectively, the gold medal for Civil and Military value for its role in World War II.

Geography

Climate
Foggia has a dry summer, Mediterranean climate (Köppen climate classification Csa). Winter days are generally between 11 and 13 °C but can be as cool as single figures. Low temperatures are generally above freezing, but frosts are experienced a handful of times a year. Summers are very hot, with temperatures in July and August often reaching . Temperatures exceed  a handful of times a decade.

Government

Main sights

 The cathedral of Santa Maria de Fovea, probably erected about 1179, which is directly linked with the patron saint "Madonna dei Sette Veli" (Madonna of the Seven Veils). This site has two levels of architectural style: the lower part is Romanesque, as with many Apulian churches; the upper part is a remarkable example of Baroque. The upper part was reconstructed after a 1731 earthquake that destroyed a great part of the historical centre.
 Palazzo Dogana, the historical seat of the sheep custom. In July 2013 this Palace was elected by UNESCO as "Messenger Monument of the Culture of Peace" for its role in the cultural exchanges during centuries.
 Chiesa delle Croci ("Church of the Crosses").
 I Tre Archi ("The Three Arches").
 Arco di Federico II ("Arch of Frederick II").
 Archaeological park of Passo di Corvo.

Economy
It is a communication and industrial center and the main wheat market of Southern Italy. Foggia is famous for its watermelons and tomatoes.

Although less important than once before, the agricultural sector remains the mainstay of Foggia's economy. This area is nicknamed the "granary of Italy". The few industries present are mostly devoted to food processing. Craftsmanship is also encouraged and developed.

Transport
Foggia railway station, opened in 1864, forms part of the Adriatic Railway (Ancona–Lecce), and is the terminus of the Naples–Foggia railway.  It is also a junction for several other, secondary lines, namely the Foggia–Manfredonia, Lucera–Foggia and Foggia–Potenza railways, making Foggia the most important railway junction of southern Italy and the third one of whole Italy. Foggia is served by Gino Lisa Airport, which offers direct flights operated with helicopters to Tremiti Islands and Vieste.

Sport
Foggia is home to the football club Calcio Foggia 1920 S.S.D., which plays in Serie C, the third football division in Italy, for the 2020-2021 season. The club earned popular recognition in the early 1990s because of its sparking interpretation of total football led by coach Zdeněk Zeman, which led to promotion to and a brief period in Serie A. The club plays at Stadio Pino Zaccheria, named after Pino Zaccheria, a local pioneer of basketball killed during World War II.

In February 2019 Foggia hosted the European Cadet and Junior Fencing Championships.

Notable people

 Renzo Arbore (born 1937), TV showman and musician.
 Alex Baroni, singer
 Adriano Celentano, TV showman, musician and actor.
 Donato Coco (born 1956), automobile designer, currently chief designer at Ferrari.
 Mauro De Mauro (1921–1970), journalist assassinated by mafia.
 Pietro Giannone, philosopher
 Umberto Giordano (1867–1948), composer, whose memory is honored in the town square.
 Vladimir Luxuria (born 1965), transgender Italian politician
 Mario Mauro, minister of defence
 Andrea Pazienza, cartoonist
 Pio e Amedeo (born 1983), actors and producers
 Michele Placido, actor and director
 Nicola Sacco, anarchist prisoner executed by U.S. government.
 Tony Slydini (1900–1991), master close up magician.
 Vincent Simone (born 1979), dancer.
 Nicola Zingarelli, philologist

International relations

Twin towns – sister cities
Foggia is twinned with:

 Göppingen, Germany, since 1971
 Wałbrzych, Poland, since 1998
 Pescasseroli, Italy, since 2005
 Forlì, Italy, since 2009
 L'Aquila, Italy, since 2009
 Quimper, France, since 2011
 Erzurum, Turkey, since 1987

In popular culture
The TV character Archie Bunker on All in the Family spent time in Foggia when he was in the Army Air Corps.

See also
 Capitanata
 Gargano
 Tavoliere delle Puglie
 Province of Foggia
 Bombing of Foggia in 1943 (World War II)
 Foggia Airfield Complex (World War II)

References

External links

 Foggia News and Television
 www.ManganoFoggia.it - Website about city of Foggia, with its culture, history, curiosities
 The portal of Foggia and province 
 City of Foggia's official site
 LaProvinciadiFoggia.it - Portal of the Foggia's province
 Small Town Foggia
 Small Town Foggia-Vieste

 
Cities and towns in Apulia